The European Ultramarathon Cup, was an annual cup event covering some of the biggest Ultramarathon races in Europe from 1992 until 2019.

League 

For a league score, for each runner the three best races during a calendar year were scored. The weighting factor was calculated based on the best finishing times during the previous year and is normalized on the finishing time of the 100 km Del Passatore. The runners were ranked based on their average score.

League races 

(2019)

Previous league races 

Rennsteiglauf, 73 km,  Germany
 Wachau-Ultramarathon, 51 km, Austria
 Wörthersee-Trail, 60 km, Austria
 Biel Running Days, 100 km, Switzerland

References

External links
 European Cup of Ultramarathons website

Ultramarathons
Ultramarathon